Missouri ex rel. Gaines v. Canada, 305 U.S. 337 (1938),  was a United States Supreme Court decision holding that states which provided a school to white students had to provide in-state education to blacks as well. States could satisfy this requirement by allowing blacks and whites to attend the same school or creating a second school for blacks.

Background
The Registrar at the Law School of the University of Missouri, Silas Woodson Canada, refused admission to Lloyd Gaines because he was black. At the time, blacks could attend no law school specifically in the state. Gaines cited that the refusal violated the Fourteenth Amendment. The State of Missouri had offered to pay for Gaines's tuition at an adjacent state's law school, which he turned down.

Gaines, assisted by the NAACP, sued the all-white university in 1935. The issue was whether Missouri violated the Equal Protection Clause of the Fourteenth Amendment by affording whites, not blacks, the ability to attend law school within the state.

Trial
The initial trial started in Columbia, Missouri in Boone County.

Decision
Writing for the majority, Chief Justice Charles Evans Hughes held that when the state provides legal training, it must provide it to every qualified person to satisfy equal protection. It can neither send them to other states, nor condition that training for one group of people, such as blacks, on levels of demand from that group. Key to the court's conclusion was that there was no provision for legal education of blacks in Missouri so Missouri law guaranteeing equal protection applied. Sending Gaines to another state would have been irrelevant.

Justice James C. McReynolds's dissent emphasized a body of case law, with sweeping statements about state control of education before suggesting the possibility that despite the majority opinion, Missouri could still deny Gaines admission.

The decision did not quite strike down separate but equal facilities, upheld in Plessy v. Ferguson (1896). Instead, it provided that if there was only one school, students of all races could be admitted. The decision struck down segregation by exclusion if the government provided just one school, making the decision in this case a precursor to Brown v. Board of Education (1954).

This marked the beginning of the Supreme Court's reconsideration of Plessy. The Supreme Court did not overturn Plessy v. Ferguson or violate the "separate but equal" precedents, but began to concede the difficulty and near-impossibility of a state maintaining segregated black and white institutions that could never be truly equal. Therefore, it can be said that this case helped forge the legal framework for Brown v. Board of Education, which banned segregation in public schools.

Despite the initial victory claimed by the NAACP, after the Supreme Court had ruled in Gaines' favor and ordered the Missouri Supreme Court to reconsider the case, Gaines was nowhere to be found. When the University of Missouri soon after moved to dismiss the case, the NAACP did not oppose the motion.

See also
 List of United States Supreme Court Cases
 Civil Rights Cases
 Sipuel v. Board of Regents of Univ. of Okla. - 
 Sweatt v. Painter - 
 Brown v. Board of Education of Topeka - 
 Timeline of the civil rights movement

References

External links

 
 A profile of Gaines' attorney, Charles Hamilton Houston, and the Gaines case
 PBS's case page in their history of segregation

1938 in United States case law
United States Supreme Court cases
United States Supreme Court cases of the Hughes Court
United States equal protection case law
United States racial desegregation case law
United States education case law
1938 in Missouri
20th century in Columbia, Missouri
African-American history in Columbia, Missouri
History of racism in Missouri
Legal history of Missouri
African-American history between emancipation and the civil rights movement
University of Missouri
Civil rights movement case law